Emma Roddick (born 30 July 1997) is a Scottish National Party (SNP) politician who has been a Member of the Scottish Parliament (MSP) for Highlands and Islands since May 2021.

Early life
Roddick was born to Sue, a social worker, and Davy Roddick and lived in Alness from an early age. Both of her parents had died by the time she was elected in May 2021. She formerly worked for the Scottish Ambulance Service.

Roddick, who has Borderline personality disorder (BPD) and PTSD, started a petition in 2017 to improve the available services from Scotland's NHS24 helpline. In 2020 the campaign proved successful, and NHS 24 added option 3 to their service.

Political career
In November 2019 she was elected in a by-election as a Councillor, representing the Inverness Central ward of the Highland Council. Shortly after starting her campaign, she started receiving death and rape threats from anonymous  sources, and had her home broken into twice. The month before, she refused to sign a petition opposing the Gender Recognition Act reforms, claiming the petition had "transphobic undertones".

On 8 May 2021 she was elected as a Member of the Scottish Parliament (MSP) for Highlands and Islands. She was one of the youngest candidates seeking election, and the youngest MSP elected.

After her election in 2021, Roddick, who had been homeless in the past, spoke about the financial burdens of running for office which provide barriers to young and working-class people running, and highlighted the initial cost of being an MSP.

Personal life
Roddick plays the fiddle. She lives in Merkinch in Inverness and identifies as bisexual.

References

External links
 
 Profile at Highland Council

1997 births
Living people
Members of the Scottish Parliament 2021–2026
Scottish National Party MSPs
Scottish National Party councillors
Councillors in Highland (council area)
Female members of the Scottish Parliament
People with borderline personality disorder
Bisexual politicians
LGBT members of the Scottish Parliament
Women councillors in Scotland